Diaphus ostenfeldi, the Ostenfeld's lanternfish, is a species of lanternfish 
found Worldwide.

Size

Etymology
The fish is named in honor of the late Carl Hansen Ostenfeld (1873–1931), a Danish botanist and the chairman of the committee that edited the oceanographic reports of the Dana expeditions.

References

Myctophidae
Taxa named by Åge Vedel Tåning
Fish described in 1932